Route 362 is a collector road in the Canadian province of Nova Scotia.

It is located in Annapolis County and connects Middleton at Trunk 1 with East Margaretsville.

Communities
Middleton
Spa Springs
Victoria Vale
Margaretsville
East Margaretsville

See also
List of Nova Scotia provincial highways

References

362
362
Middleton, Nova Scotia